Árpád Bárány (born 24 June 1931) is a Hungarian fencer. He won a gold medal in the team épée event at the 1964 Summer Olympics.

References

External links
 

1931 births
Living people
Hungarian male épée fencers
Olympic fencers of Hungary
Fencers at the 1960 Summer Olympics
Fencers at the 1964 Summer Olympics
Olympic gold medalists for Hungary
Olympic medalists in fencing
Martial artists from Budapest
Medalists at the 1964 Summer Olympics
20th-century Hungarian people
21st-century Hungarian people